Geordie in Wonderland is a 2006 live album by The Wildhearts. It was recorded at Scarborough Castle in 2005, and consists of the audio from a live DVD (Live at the castle) that was filmed that night by Secret/Snapper records.

Reception

Track listing

"I Wanna Go Where the People Go"
"Sick of Drugs"
"Greeting From Shitsville"
"Nita Nitro"
"Stormy in the North, Karma in the South"
"TV Tan"
"Nothing Ever Changes (But the Shoes)"
"Everlone"
"Geordie in Wonderland"
"Vanilla Radio"
"Caffeine Bomb"
"Suckerpunch"
"My Baby is a Headfuck"
"29 x the Pain"
"Love U 'Till I Don't"

Personnel
  Ginger - vocals, guitar
 C. J. - guitar, vocals
 Ritch Battersby - drums
 Danny McCormack - bass, vocals

2006 live albums
The Wildhearts live albums